Lingayat Education Association is an education institution that was established by Rao Bahadur Gurusiddappa V. Gilaganchi and Rao Bahadur Rudragouda C. Aratal in 1883 at Dharwad.

Colleges
 Lingayat Education Association's Homeopathic Medical College and Hospital, Dharwad
 Lingayat Education Association's Awwappanna Attigeri ITI, Dharwad

References

Education in Dharwad district
Educational institutions in India
1883 establishments in India
Educational institutions established in 1883